Electoral history of Sergey Mironov, Member of the State Duma, former Senator from Saint Petersburg and 3rd Chairman of the Federation Council.

1998 Saint Petersburg Legislative Assembly election

Chairman of the Federation Council elections

2001

2003

2007

2011 Chairman of the State Duma election

Presidential elections

2004

2012

References

Mironov
Sergey Mironov